Phillip Allen Sharp (born June 6, 1944) is an American geneticist and molecular biologist who co-discovered RNA splicing. He shared the 1993 Nobel Prize in Physiology or Medicine with Richard J. Roberts for "the discovery that genes in eukaryotes are not contiguous strings but contain introns, and that the splicing of messenger RNA to delete those introns can occur in different ways, yielding different proteins from the same DNA sequence". He has been selected to receive the 2015 Othmer Gold Medal.

Research
Sharp's current research focuses on small RNAs and other types of non-coding RNAs. His laboratory works to identify the target mRNAs of microRNAs (miRNAs), and has discovered a class of miRNAs that are produced from sequences adjacent to transcription start sites. His laboratory also studies how miRNA gene regulation functions in angiogenesis and cellular stress.

Biography
Sharp was born in Falmouth, Kentucky, the son of Kathrin (Colvin) and Joseph Walter Sharp. He married Ann Holcombe in 1964, and they have three daughters.

Sharp studied at Union College and majored in chemistry and mathematics, afterwards completing his Ph.D. in chemistry at the University of Illinois at Urbana-Champaign in 1969. Following his Ph.D., he did his postdoctoral training at the California Institute of Technology until 1971, where he studied plasmids. Later, he studied gene expression in human cells at the Cold Spring Harbor Laboratory as a senior scientist under James D. Watson.

In 1974, he was offered a position at MIT by biologist Salvador Luria.  He was director of MIT's Center for Cancer Research (now the Koch Institute for Integrative Cancer Research) from 1985 to 1991; head of the Biology department from 1991 to 1999; and founder and director of the McGovern Institute for Brain Research from 2000 to 2004.  In 1995, the FBI confirmed that Sharp received a letter from Ted Kaczynski, insinuating that Sharp would become a target of the Unabomber because of his work in genetics, stating that "it would be beneficial to your health to stop your research in genetics." 

He is currently a professor of Biology and member of the Koch Institute, and has been an Institute Professor since 1999. He is also the chair of the advisory board of the MIT Jameel Clinic. Sharp co-founded Biogen, Alnylam Pharmaceuticals, and Magen Biosciences, and has served on the boards of all three companies.

Awards and honors

In addition to the Nobel Prize, Sharp has won several notable awards, including the 2004 National Medal of Science, the 1999 Benjamin Franklin Medal for Distinguished Achievement in the Sciences of the American Philosophical Society, the Golden Plate Award of the American Academy of Achievement in 1981, and the 1988 Louisa Gross Horwitz Prize from Columbia University together with Thomas R. Cech.

Sharp is an elected member of several academic societies, including the American Academy of Arts and Sciences, the American Association for the Advancement of Science, the National Academy of Sciences, and the Institute of Medicine of the National Academies. He was elected a Foreign Member of the Royal Society (ForMemRS) in 2011. In 2012, he was elected the president of the American Association for the Advancement of Science. He is also a Member and Chair of the Scientific Advisory Board of Fidelity Biosciences Group; a member of the Board of Advisors of Polaris Venture Partners; chairman of the Scientific Advisory Board and member of the Board of Directors of Alnylam Pharmaceuticals; advisor and investor at Longwood and Polaris Venture Funds; a member of the Boards of Directors at Syros Pharmaceuticals and VIR Biotechnology; and member and Chair of the Scientific Advisory Board at Dewpoint Biotechnology.

Pendleton County, Kentucky, Sharp's birthplace, named its current middle school after him.

Other activities
In October 2010 Sharp participated in the USA Science and Engineering Festival's Lunch with a Laureate program where middle and high school students got to engage in an informal conversation with a Nobel Prize-winning scientist over a brown-bag lunch. Sharp is also a member of the USA Science and Engineering Festival's Advisory Board.  In 2011, he was listed at #5 on the MIT150 list of the top 150 innovators and ideas from MIT.

He is an editorial advisor to Xconomy, and is a member of the Board of Scientific Governors at The Scripps Research Institute. He has also served on the Faculty Advisory Board of the MIT-Harvard Research Journal and MIT Student Research Association.

Selected publications

See also
 History of RNA biology
 List of RNA biologists
 MIT Department of Biology

References

External links
 
 
 

1944 births
Living people
American geneticists
American Nobel laureates
California Institute of Technology faculty
Members of the European Molecular Biology Organization
Massachusetts Institute of Technology School of Science faculty
National Medal of Science laureates
Nobel laureates in Physiology or Medicine
People from Pendleton County, Kentucky
University of Illinois Urbana-Champaign alumni
Scripps Research
Union College (Kentucky) alumni
Members of the United States National Academy of Sciences
Members of the National Academy of Medicine
Foreign Members of the Royal Society
Recipients of the Albert Lasker Award for Basic Medical Research